The Lanark Hydro Electric Scheme refers to two hydroelectric plants in the Clydesdale area of South Lanarkshire, Scotland. They take in water from the Falls of Clyde.

The two plants are known as Bonnington Power Station which takes in water from just above Bonnington Linn in New Lanark, and Stonebyres Power Station which takes water from above Stonebyres Linn near Kirkfieldbank.

Of the two stations that make up the Lanark hydro electric scheme, Bonnington is the larger and both stations combined have an output of 16 MW.

The Lanark Hydro Electric Scheme is the first of its kind in the United Kingdom to produce a clean renewable energy, using water from the falls Clyde to power homes and meet the demand for electricity after World War I. Lanark Hydro Electric scheme does not use dams for water storage, since it takes its water from the waterfalls and uses it as a tilting head. The pipes are designed in a way to take the water and divert it to the two power stations located in Stonebyres and Bonnington. Together these create electricity for over 17,000 homes in the UK They are hoping to use the hydro electric scheme, along with other natural energy sources, to make 40% of the energy used in the UK by 2020.

The Lanark hydro electric scheme was the first of its kind for Britain, on a large scale, it was a technical wonder, because it used energy from the River Clyde's flow to generate power for the electric company. The hydro electric scheme is now a great place to look, when trying to figure out sustainable energy, for the rest of the world.

History
The Lanark Hydro Electric Scheme consisted of the first hydroelectric plants constructed in the United Kingdom. It was designed by Buchan & Partners, and the site agent was Guy Maunsell, who was working for Sir William Arrol & Co. The Westminster parliament approved plans to construct a hydroelectric plant on the Clyde in 1924 and construction began in 1926. Construction of Bonnington Power Station was completed in 1926, followed by Stonebyres Power Station which was completed in 1927. The scheme remained a public asset for several decades, until the privatisation of the energy industry in the 1980s. It is currently owned by Scottish Power.

When the Lanark scheme was proposed, critics were concerned because the location where the stations were to be built, was known for its beauty. Sir Edward MacColl, Chief Technical Engineer for Clyde Valley Electrical Power Company, calmed them with architectural and technical achievements, which made the stations blend into, while complementing the rural look of the landscape. Sir Edward made it a point to preserve the beauty of the Clyde Falls and use adapted technology. This would ensure that there was no need for a reservoir. The water would still run over the falls while also running through the weirs to collect/create the energy/electricity. This kind of scheme is called a run-of-the-river scheme because it uses the natural flow and amount of water to create the power. Sir Edward did so well in the development of the Lanark Hydro Electric Scheme that it became the standard for future hydro electric schemes. The design of the Lanark Hydro Electric Scheme is the gold standard when it comes to ingenuity, design and function.

Drax Group plc acquired the Lanark Hydro Electric Scheme when it purchased Scottish Power's hydro and pumped storage assets from Iberdrola.

Construction
The scheme consists of two buildings, the Bonnington and Stonebyres station. Both of these stations have a similar layout, they are single story buildings constructed with reinforced concrete. They both have large round-topped arched windows, and smaller rectangular windows, with a large flat-topped roof. Water is abstracted at intakes above from Bonnington Linn and Corra Linn. This process is done by an automatic tilting weir that regulates the flow and maintains the head of water. It has three pivoting counterbalanced gates. One of the great things about being next to the falls, is that there is year-round operation of the stations. This means that the stations do not need a reservoir to keep the water in because the water from the falls is enough to sustain it. There is almost constant operation, due to the water levels at the Clydes Falls. In 1970, both the Bonnington Power Station and the Stonebyres Power Station, started using induction generators instead of synchronous generators.

Effect on the environment
Ever since the hydro electric stations first opened in 1920, they have been working with environmental groups to make sure that they only produce clean, green energy. They work closely with the Scottish Wildlife Trust, the Scottish Environment Protection Agency, and the local communities. The Lanark Hydro Electric Scheme launched its first biodiversity action plan in 2005. The plan aimed to protect the wildlife and plant life at the Hydro Electric scheme. In 2009, they started a schedule to plan out their next environmental enhancement objectives for the next five years. Right now, over 1,900 species call the Falls of Clyde home, and many of these 1,900 are being protected by the UK Biodiversity Action Plan. This ranges from plants, to reptiles, to birds, and much more. In 1997, they helped protect the peregrine falcon from becoming endangered. The Lanark Hydros have many visitors each year, usually over 60,000 people. The SWT (Scottish Wildlife Trust) has activities and even summer programmes to help promote the use of green energy and preserve the wildlife there. In addition to wildlife preservation and green energy production, Lanark Hydro Electric Scheme produces clean energy without emitting greenhouse gasses or Carbon dioxide into the atmosphere. The associated facilities only emit Carbon that is produced by the electricity that is created and ran through the machinery used. Also, both facilities have been fitted for oil interceptor systems in case oil spills occur. The interceptors are designed to catch the spilled oil and keep the water from being contaminated in the event that an oil spill is to occur.

Lanark in the future
Due to the success of Lanark Hydro Electric Scheme, there have been numerous goals set for it in the future. The Scottish Power company, which is one of the many companies that the Lanark Hydro Electric Scheme's owners have worked with, is planning on making the scheme more efficient.  They plan to do this by using other renewable energy sources like wind power and solar power machines. This will help the scheme contribute to the 40percent renewable energy target in Scotland by the year 2020. This will be a massive step in the right direction, especially if they keep their goals high. Ever since the scheme was built in 1928, it has been a standard for how we use and how we are able to create renewable energy. This scheme is a great base point to start from when creating self-sustaining generators in the future.

References

Hydroelectric power stations in Scotland
Buildings and structures in South Lanarkshire
Lanark
River Clyde
Infrastructure completed in 1926
1926 establishments in Scotland